Johannes "Johan" Jozef Antonius Hin (January 3, 1899 Haarlem – June 29, 1957 Haarlem) was a sailor from the Netherlands who represented his native country at the 1920 Summer Olympics in Ostend, Belgium.

During the second race one of the marks was drifting and the race was abandoned. The organizers did not have time to re-sail the race that week, and so the two remaining races were rescheduled for September 3 of that year. Because both contenders were Dutch, the organizers requested that the Dutch Olympic Committee hold the race in the Netherlands.

With his father Cornelis Hin as helmsmen, Hin won the first race. His brother Frans Hin crewed the remaining races in the Netherlands on the Buiten IJ, in front of Durgerdam near Amsterdam. Hin took the gold over the combined series with the boat Beatrijs III.

In the 1924 Olympics, Hin took part in the French National Monotype and took 5th place.

Later Hin went to a monastery. There he specialized in making documentary films. His first films had sailing as topic.

Sources

Note

1899 births
1957 deaths
Sportspeople from Haarlem
Dutch male sailors (sport)
Sailors at the 1920 Summer Olympics – 12' Dinghy
Sailors at the 1924 Summer Olympics – Monotype
Olympic sailors of the Netherlands
Medalists at the 1920 Summer Olympics
Olympic medalists in sailing
Olympic gold medalists for the Netherlands
20th-century Dutch people